José Tena (born 23 January 1951) is a former Spanish cyclist. He competed in the team time trial at the 1972 Summer Olympics.

References

External links
 

1951 births
Living people
Spanish male cyclists
Olympic cyclists of Spain
Cyclists at the 1972 Summer Olympics
Cyclists from Barcelona